Allah is the word for "God" in Arabic.

It may also refer to:
 the Islamic conception of God: see God in Islam
 Allah as a lunar deity, theory in 20th Century scholarship re pre-Islamic Arabia

Geography
 Allah Valley, valley of the Allah River, Mindanao, Philippines
 Allah, a town in Nigeria also known as Illah

Similar spellings
Ullah ("of God" in Arabic)
Alla (disambiguation)
Illah (disambiguation)
Allar (disambiguation)
Aella (disambiguation)
Aello, one of the Harpy sisters in ancient Greek mythology